Joseph E. Hall House may refer to:

Joseph E. Hall House (Tecumseh, Michigan), listed on the National Register of Historic Places (NRHP)
Joseph E. Hall House (Brookville, Pennsylvania), NRHP-listed

See also
Hall House (disambiguation)